Anopheles barbumbrosus is a species complex of mosquito belonging to the genus Anopheles. It has 12-36 thin attenuated branches usually loose and separated out, which is a good indication to separate it from A. barbirostris. It shows a marked zoophilic tendency, thus is a malaria vector, but with minor importance to humans. It is distributed throughout Peninsular Malaysia, Sumatra, Java, Thailand, India and Sri Lanka, They mostly live as an outdoor mosquito species, rarely found indoor places. Larva can be found in a variety of habitats including both partially shaded and sunlit fresh and slowly running water, grass-fringed streams to stagnant water pools and man-made place like rice fields.

References

External links
Anopheles culicifacies breeding in polluted water bodies in Trincomalee District of Sri Lanka

barbumbrosus
Insects described in 1927